The Power of Music is the fourth full-length album from Kristine W, released on June 16, 2009.

Track listing

 Be Alright
 The Power of Music
 Into U
 Never
 Not So Merry Go Round
 Fade
 Walk Away
 Feel What You Want
 The Boss
 Love Is the Look
 Window to Your World
 Strings
 Do You Really Want Me
 The Groove's Inside
 Happiness
 Meet Again

References

Kristine W albums
2009 albums